Stadio Italia is a football stadium in Sorrento, Italy. The main tenants are Eccellenza Campania sides Sorrento and F.C. Sant'Agnello. It has a capacity of 3,600.

History

The stadium's construction lasted less than one year, being started and completed in 1950. The stadium originally had a grass football pitch and a capacity of 3,600. In 2003, the stadium became one of the first in Italy, along with Capo d'Orlando in Sicily and Manfredonia in Apulia, to be fitted with a synthetic grass surface, due to the salinity in the air causing issues with the natural grass. The press area at the stadium has 6 television boxes and 6 newspaper/radio boxes.

Capacity

References

Italia
Sorrento
A.S.D. Sorrento